North Yorkshire Police is the territorial police force covering the non-metropolitan county of North Yorkshire and the unitary authority of York in northern England.  As of September 2018 the force had a strength of 1,357 police officers, 127 special constables, 192 PCSOs and 1,072 police staff.  Of the 43 territorial police forces in England and Wales, the force has the 5th largest geographic area of responsibility whilst being the 15th smallest force in terms of police officer numbers.

History 

The force was formed on 1 April 1974, under the Local Government Act 1972, and was largely a successor to the York and North East Yorkshire Police, also taking part of the old West Riding Constabulary's area. The York and North East Yorkshire Police had covered the North Riding of Yorkshire, the East Riding of Yorkshire and the county borough of York; it was itself formed in 1968 from a merger of the two riding forces with the York City Police.

Proposals made by the Home Secretary on 21 March 2006 would have seen the force merge with West Yorkshire Police, South Yorkshire Police and Humberside Police to form a strategic police force for the entire region.  However, these proposals were later dropped.

It was announced in January 2007 that the then Chief Constable, Della Cannings, would be retiring from the force on 16 May 2007 due to illness. Della Cannings made the headlines on a number of occasions. She was not allowed to purchase wine from Tesco in Northallerton in March 2004 until she had taken off her hat and epaulettes, as it was illegal to sell alcohol to on-duty police officers. In October 2006 it was revealed that more than £28,000 had been spent to refurbish a shower in her office.

On 19 April 2007, it was announced that Grahame Maxwell was to become the new Chief Constable of North Yorkshire Police.  Grahame Maxwell began his career with Cleveland Police and served in all ranks up to Chief Superintendent when he became District Commander in Middlesbrough.  After completing the Strategic Command Course in 2000, he was appointed as an Assistant Chief Constable with West Yorkshire Police and during his four years there served as the ACC Specialist Operations and ACC Territorial Operations.  Mr Maxwell was promoted to Deputy Chief Constable with South Yorkshire Police in January 2005 and become the Chief Constable of North Yorkshire Police on 17 May 2007.

Dave Jones QPM, was appointed as chief constable in 2013 after serving as Assistant Chief Constable at the Police Service of Northern Ireland, where he had command of the Rural Division. He was awarded the Queen's Police Medal in the 2017 New Year Honours List and retired from the role in 2018.

In July 2017, the force's headquarters was moved from Newby Wiske to Alverton Court in Northallerton. The new headquarters is the former offices of the Rural Payments Agency. The previous headquarters at Newby Wiske is a grade II listed building and was becoming difficult to upgrade into the 21st century. The memorial stones commemorating those who have served the police in the region have been moved to the new headquarters from Newby Wiske. These include those who have died in the First and the Second World Wars and also those who have died in the line of duty.

In August 2018, it was confirmed that Lisa Winward would become the new chief constable with immediate effect. Winward joined the police in 1993 and has been serving in the North Yorkshire police service since 2008.

Governance and oversight 

Since November 2012, the force has been overseen by the elected North Yorkshire Police and Crime Commissioner. Since 2018, this role has also included oversight of the North Yorkshire Fire and Rescue Service.  In October 2021, the incumbent commissioner Philip Allott resigned following comments surrounding the murder of Sarah Everard.

Previously, North Yorkshire Police Authority had nine councillors (drawn from both North Yorkshire County Council and City of York Council), three justices of the peace, and five independent members.

Chief constables
1974–1977 : Robert Boyes
1977–1979 : John Woodcock
1979–1985 : Kenneth Henshaw
1985–1989 : Peter Nobes
1989–1998 : David Burke 
1998–2002 : David Kenworthy 
2002–2007 : Della Cannings
2007–2012 : Graham Maxwell 
2012–2013 : Tim Madgwick
2013–2018 : Dave Jones
2018–present : Lisa Winward

Officers killed in the line of duty

The Police Roll of Honour Trust and Police Memorial Trust list and commemorate all British police officers killed in the line of duty. Since its establishment in 1984, the Police Memorial Trust has erected 50 memorials nationally to some of those officers.

The following officers of North Yorkshire Police are listed by the trust as having died attempting to prevent, stop or solve a crime, since the turn of the 20th century:
Acting DC Norman Garnham, 1977 (fatally stabbed during an arrest)
PC David Ian Haigh, 1982 (shot dead by Barry Prudom)
Sergeant David Thomas Winter, 1982 (shot dead by Barry Prudom)
Special constable Glenn Thomas Goodman, 1992 (shot dead; posthumously awarded the Queen's Commendation for Brave Conduct)

See also
List of law enforcement agencies in the United Kingdom, Crown Dependencies and British Overseas Territories
Law enforcement in the United Kingdom

References

External links

 North Yorkshire Police at HMICFRS
Operation Countryman 2 is Launched

Organisations based in North Yorkshire
Police forces of England
1974 establishments in England
Organizations established in 1974